Impossibility theorem could refer to:
 Proof of impossibility, a negative proof of a theory
 Arrow's impossibility theorem in welfare economics